The 1952 United States Senate elections was an election for the United States Senate which coincided with the election of Dwight D. Eisenhower to the presidency by a large margin. The 32 Senate seats of Class 1 were contested in regular elections, and three special elections were held to fill vacancies. The Republicans took control of the Senate by managing to make a net gain of two seats, which was reduced to one when Wayne Morse (R-OR) became an independent.  The Republicans still held a majority after Morse's switch. This election was the second time in history (after 1932) that the party in power lost their majority and the Senate majority leader lost his own re-election bid. In addition, this was the third time, as well as second consecutive, in which a sitting Senate leader lost his seat.

This was the last time the Senate changed hands in a presidential election year until 1980 and the last time the Republicans won control of the Senate until 1980. As of 2020, this is the last time both houses simultaneously changed hands in a presidential year.

Results summary 

Colored shading indicates party with largest share of that row.

Source: Clerk of the U.S. House of Representatives

Gains, losses and holds

Retirements
One Republican and one Democrat retired instead of seeking re-election. One Republican and one Democrat also retired instead of finishing the unexpired term.

Defeats
Four Republicans and five Democrats sought re-election, and one Republican and one Democrat also sought election to run to finish the unexpired term or in the six-year term but lost in the primary or general election.

Change in composition

Before the elections 
Going into the November elections.

Results of the elections

Beginning of the next Congress

Race summaries

Special elections during the 82nd Congress 
In these special elections the winners were seated before January 3, 1953; ordered by election date, then state.

Races leading to the 83rd Congress 
In these general elections, the winner was seated on January 3, 1953; ordered by state.

All of the elections involved the Class 1 seats.

Closest races 
Twenty races had a margin of victory under 10%:

Arizona

California

Connecticut

There were two elections on the same day due to the July 28, 1952 death of two-term Democrat Brien McMahon.

Republican businessman William Purtell was appointed August 29, 1952 to continue the class 3 term, pending a special election in which he was not a candidate.  Purtell was already the Republican nominee in the regular election for the class 1 seat, a race he then won.

Connecticut (special)

Connecticut (regular)

Delaware

Florida

Indiana

Kentucky (special)

Maine

Maryland

Massachusetts

Michigan 

There were two elections to the same seat on the same day due to the April 18, 1951 death of five-term Republican Arthur Vandenberg.  Democratic journalist Blair Moody was appointed April 23, 1951 to continue the term pending a special election.  The primary elections were held August 5, 1952.  Moody lost both the special and the regular elections to Republican congressman Charles E. Potter.

Michigan (special)

Michigan (regular)

Minnesota

Mississippi

Missouri

Montana

Nebraska

Nebraska (special)

Nebraska (regular)

Nevada

New Jersey 

As of 2020, this was the last time that Republicans have won the Class 1 U.S. Senate seat from New Jersey.

New Mexico

New York

In New York, the Liberal State Committee met on August 28, and nominated Dr. George S. Counts, Professor of Education at Teachers College, Columbia University, for the U.S. Senate.  The Republican State Committee re-nominated the incumbent U.S. senator Irving M. Ives. The Democratic State Committee met on August 28, and nominated Brooklyn Borough President John Cashmore for the U.S. Senate.

The Republican incumbent Ives was re-elected with the then largest plurality in state history.

North Dakota

Ohio

Pennsylvania

Rhode Island

Tennessee

Texas 

Incumbent Democratic U.S. Senator Tom Connally did not run for re-election to a fifth term.

Attorney General Price Daniel won the open race to succeed him, defeating U.S. Representative Lindley Beckworth in the Democratic primary on July 26. Daniel was unopposed in the general election, as the Texas Republican Party chose to endorse the Democratic ticket for all but one statewide offices to maximize votes for their presidential nominee Dwight Eisenhower.

Utah

Vermont

Virginia

Washington

West Virginia

Wisconsin

Wyoming

See also
 1952 United States elections
 1952 United States presidential election
 1952 United States House of Representatives elections
 82nd United States Congress
 83rd United States Congress

Notes

References

Sources